Demequina aurantiaca is a Gram-positive bacterium from the genus Demequina which has been isolated from seaweed from the Lake Hamana from Shizuoka in Japan.

References

Micrococcales
Bacteria described in 2011